Anandamela, Anondamela, or Anondomela (Bengali: আনন্দমেলা) is a children's periodical in the Bengali language published by the ABP Group from Kolkata, India.

History and profile
The first issue of Anandamela appeared in March 1975. Satyajit Ray designed the cover of first issue. The magazine is published on a fortnightly basis. It has been edited by several eminent personalities at different times including the poet Nirendranath Chakravarty, Ashok Kumar Sarkar, and Debasish Bandopadhyay. The present editor is Caeser Bagchi . Anandamela is one of the oldest surviving Bengali children's magazines and is published twice a month, on the fifth (previously second) and twentieth days. 

Many authors started writing for children through Anandamela; for example, author Shirshendu Mukhopadhyay was noticed as a children's author after writing Manojder Adbhut Baari, which was published in Anandamela as a serial novel. On 19 June 2004, Anandamela split up into two different magazines, the original Anandamela (for children age 8 – 14), and Unish Kuri, (for teens and young adults age 15 – 25).

Popular series, novels, and stories 
 Aranyadeb (The Phantom) comics (translated from English)
 Archie Comics (translated from English)
 Arjun by Samaresh Majumdar
 Asterix comics written by René Goscinny and illustrated by Albert Uderzo (translated from French)
 Bagha (Tiger) comic (translated from English)
 Batman comics (translated from English)
  Chander Pahar comics by Bibhutibhusan Bandyopadhyay, with art by Sidhhartha Chaterjee
 Dodo & Tatai by Tarapada Roy
 Doohsahosi Tintin (The Adventures of Tintin) comics by Hergé (translated from French)
 Dosyi Dennis (Dennis the Menace) comics (translated from English)
 Dyuti, Hitoishi and Young Detective Kabulda by Rajesh Basu
 Ekenbabu series by Sujan DaGupta
 Feluda comics by Satyajit Ray, art by Abhijit Chattopadhyay
 Flash Gordon comics
 Gablu (Henry) comics (translated from English)
 GhanaDa by Premendra Mitra
 Gogol by Samaresh Basu
 Gupi & Panu by Leela Majumdar
 He-Man Comics (translated from English)
 Jo-Jet-Jocko (Jo, Zette and Jocko) comics by Hergé (translated from French)
 Kakababu by Sunil Gangopadhyay
 Kalaboti by Moti Nandy
 Kikira by Bimal Kar
Dithi, Kolpyo, Sruneet and Kaga, Boga by Debasis Bandyopadhyay 
 Manojder Adbhut Bari, Harano Kakatua, Gosaibaganer Bhoot, and Sadhubabar Lathi (novels) by Shirshendu Mukhopadhyay
 Mitin & Tupur by Suchitra Bhattacharya
 Pandab Goenda by Sasthipada Chattopadhyay
 Professor Shonku by Satyajit Ray
 Rahasyer Sandhane, Cent Rahasya (novels), Hans-saheber Behala, Rimbor Aschorjo Putul, Nafargarer Hambir Mahal (stories) by Rajesh Basu
 Rappa Rayer Kando comics by Sujog Bondhopadhya
 Rovers-er Roy (Roy of the Rovers) comics (translated from English)
 Spider-Man comics (translated from English)
 Tarzan comics (translated from English)
 Tenida comics by Narayan Gangopadhyay, with art by Arijit Dutt Chowdhury
 Comics based on the stories by Shibram Chakraborty, with art by Saurav Mukhopadhyay
 Comics based on the stories by Parshuram (Rajshekhar Bose)

Key writers 
 Rajesh Basu
 Debasis Bandyopadhyay
 Samaresh Basu
 Suchitra Bhattacharya
 Dulendra Bhowmik
 Sanjeev Chattopadhyay
 Sukanto Gangopadhyay
 Sunil Gangopadhyay
 Sailen Ghosh
 Bimal Kar
 Samaresh Majumdar
 Premendra Mitra
 Shirshendu Mukhopadhyay
 Moti Nandy
 Anil Bhowmik
 Satyajit Ray
 Nabanita Dev Sen

Key artists
Art and artists were always an important part of Anandamela, thus giving birth to some memorable artistic talents. Among the large number of artists who illustrated the pages and covers of Anandamela are:

 Kunal Barman
 Onkar Nath Bhattacharya
 Shubhaprasanna Bhattacharya
 Krishnendu Chaki
 Amitava Chandra
 Abhijit Chattopadhyay
 Subrata Chowdhury
 Bimal Das
 Saumen Das
 Debasish Deb
 Subrata Gangopadhyay
 Pratyaybhaswar Jana
 Sudhir Maitra
 Roudra Mitra
 Ahibhushan Malik
 Prasenjit Nath
 Satyajit Ray
 Anup Roy
 Baishali Sarkar
 Samir Sarkar

Special issue (Puja Number)
In October, the Bengali festive month, Anandamela comes in a special size of nearly 400 pages, the hallmark of which is Sunil Gangopadhyay's new novel of the thriller series Kakababu, along with a full-length Feluda comic based on the story of Oscar-winning director Satyajit Ray, illustrated by Abhijit Chattopadhyay. This special number features five to six full length complete novels, several short stories, features, and three complete comic strips, some of which run up to 60 pages.

Although the fortnightly regular issues of Anandamela started much later, the Puja Number started in 1971. Its price was Rs. 2.00 and it did not contain any cartoons. Sunil Gangopadhyay and Satyajit Ray are the only writers whose writings are present in every Puja Number of Anandamela from the beginning of the magazine.

Other activities
The Anandamela Club has a system of paid membership that arranges various programs, competitions and activities throughout the year for children.

Criticism
Anandamela has been criticised in the past for their over-dependence on foreign comics. After Paulami Sengupta took charge as the editor, original comics based on Bengali literature were introduced, and all foreign comics were pulled, including The Adventures of Tintin, which was the hallmark and flagship brand of Anandamela.

See also

Unish Kuri, sister publication of Anandamela

References

External links
 Official website

1975 establishments in West Bengal
ABP Group
Bengali-language magazines
Biweekly magazines published in India
Children's magazines published in India
Indian comics
Magazines established in 1975
Mass media in Kolkata